Ildikó Pelczné Gáll (née Gáll; born on 2 May 1962 in Szikszó) is a Hungarian politician and a former Member of the European Parliament (MEP) from Hungary.
She is a member of Fidesz, part of the European People's Party.

She graduated from the Faculty of Mechanical Engineering at the Technical University of Heavy Industry in Miskolc. She studied at post-graduate in economics, has acquired rights and tax consultant auditor. She worked as a university lecturer, received a doctoral degree.

In 2005 she became a member of the national authorities of Fidesz. In 2006 she was elected deputy to the National Assembly. She was Vice-President of the fraction of Deputies of her group, and from July 2009 to May 2010 she served as Deputy Speaker of the Parliament.

In the 2010 national elections, she gained re-election. Soon after, she became a member of the European Parliament, when she replaced Pál Schmitt. Between 2014 and 2017, she was one of the Vice-Presidents of the European Parliament, representing the EPP group.

Since 2017, she is a Member of the European Court of Auditors.

Personal life
She is married to Gábor Pelcz. They have three children.

References

External links
CV on the website of the European Court of Auditors
CV from her official page
Parliamentary data sheet - Pelczné Gáll Ildikó
CV published in the website of FIDESZ
Az MTA Miskolci Területi Bizottságának honlapja

1962 births
Living people
Fidesz MEPs
MEPs for Hungary 2009–2014
Women MEPs for Hungary
Members of the National Assembly of Hungary (2006–2010)
Members of the National Assembly of Hungary (2010–2014)
MEPs for Hungary 2014–2019
Women members of the National Assembly of Hungary
People from Szikszó
21st-century Hungarian politicians